Joe Lynn Turner (born Joseph Arthur Mark Linquito, August 2, 1951) is an American singer known for his work in the hard rock bands Rainbow, Yngwie J. Malmsteen and Deep Purple.

During his career, Turner fronted and played guitar with pop rock band Fandango in the late 1970s; and in the early 1980s, he became a member of Rainbow, fronting the band and writing songs with guitarist, Ritchie Blackmore and bassist, and producer, Roger Glover. After Rainbow had disbanded in March 1984, he pursued a solo career, released one album, Rescue You, and sang backing vocals for Billy Joel, Cher, and Michael Bolton along with radio and television jingles. He also collaborated with songwriters Desmond Child and Jack Ponti. Turner had a short-lived association with neoclassical metal guitarist Yngwie Malmsteen and then Deep Purple. From the mid-1990s, he resumed his solo career, releasing an additional nine studio and two live recordings. He continued to perform session work, and collaborated with the groups Mother's Army and Hughes Turner Project and Sunstorm, the latter of which released five albums with Turner. In 2016, Turner released The Sessions via Cleopatra Records.

Career

Early work

Turner was born in Hackensack, New Jersey, on August 2, 1951, and became interested in music in the 1960s. Growing up in an Italian-American home, he was influenced by singers such as Frank Sinatra and Enrico Caruso.  In high school, he formed the band Ezra, performing original material and cover songs. He played the accordion as a child and learned the guitar in his early teens. He was once influenced primarily by such artists as Led Zeppelin, Jimi Hendrix and Free.

In 1977, Turner joined the rock band Fandango, who signed with RCA Records. Turner sang and played guitar on the band's four albums. Fandango toured with numerous artists including The Allman Brothers Band, The Marshall Tucker Band, The Beach Boys and Billy Joel.

Rainbow
After Fandango split, he received a phone call from British guitarist Ritchie Blackmore. This resulted in an audition and Turner was immediately enlisted in Rainbow. The band, while popular in Europe and Japan, had not reached the same level of success in the US. Turner contributed a pop influence to the band, and Rainbow became successful in the US. Several tracks from albums with Turner reached the Top 20 on rock radio charts in the early to mid-1980s. "Stone Cold" became Rainbow's first Top 40 hit and the band's videos were played on heavy rotation on MTV.  Turner recorded three studio albums with Rainbow: Difficult to Cure, Straight Between the Eyes, and Bent Out of Shape, which featured the single, "Street of Dreams".  Rainbow disbanded in 1984.

Solo (1980s)
In 1985, after the break-up of Rainbow, Turner released a solo album, Rescue You, produced by Roy Thomas Baker, known for his work with Queen and The Cars. He co-wrote most of the songs with keyboardist Al Greenwood (Foreigner). The first single, "Endlessly," received extensive airplay on radio and MTV. Tours with Night Ranger and Pat Benatar and an acting role in the TV movie Blue Deville followed.

In 1987, Turner also supplied backing vocals to the Michael Bolton album, The Hunger. He appeared on the tracks, "Hot Love" and "Gina".

That same year (1987), he joined Yngwie Malmsteen's Rising Force and recorded the album Odyssey. The brief tour that followed the release of the album included a concert in Leningrad, which was recorded and then released as Trial by Fire (1989). Later that year he left the band.

Deep Purple
Turner was asked to join both Bad Company and Foreigner, but opted to join Deep Purple. Turner recorded one album, Slaves and Masters (1990). The album peaked at No. 87 on the Billboard Charts, and a relatively successful tour followed in 1991, but Turner left the band in late 1992. He has also put out three albums for the progressive rock band Mother's Army, featuring Jeff Watson, Bob Daisley, and Carmine Appice.

Solo (1992–present)

After his stints with Rising Force and Deep Purple, Turner spent the mid-1990s through 2008, working on his solo career. It was during that time, Turner released an additional nine studio albums and two live albums, to go along with his 1985 offering, Rescue You.

He also worked with Brazen Abbot, led by Bulgarian guitarist Nikolo Kotzev. Contributing songs he wrote or co-wrote with producer, Bob Held, Turner sang those songs on four studio albums including, Eye of the Storm (1996); Bad Religion (1997); Guilty As Sin (2003); and My Resurrection (2005). In 2001, Turner took part in the role of "The Narrator" in the rock opera, Nikolo Kotzev's Nostradamus. Turner also fronted the band for a majority of their live performances in Bulgaria. As a result, Turner appears on the 2005 documentary style/live performance DVD release entitled, A Decade of Brazen Abbot, as well as the 2015 studio/live compilation release of 20 Years of Brazen Abbot.

In 2000, Turner first approached former Trapeze and Deep Purple bassist, Glenn Hughes to perform some live dates in Japan in support of Turner's sixth solo album, Holy Man. In 2001, the pair formed Hughes Turner Project. The collaboration resulted in two studio albums (HTP and HTP2) and a live album (Live in Tokyo) between 2001 and 2003. In 2005, Hughes and Turner collaborated once more on the Russian studio project Michael Men Project's album Made in Moscow.

The May 11, 2000 PBS show Between the Lions, featured his vocal on the song "Clobbered" in the season 1, episode 29 episode entitled Giants and Cubs. Another song, "Very Loud, Very Big, Very Metal", was also featured.

On August 4, 2006, Turner gave a special performance of Rainbow songs with the New Japan Philharmonic at the Metropolitan Art Space in Tokyo, Japan. Later that same year in September 2006, Turner released the first album for Frontiers Records AOR project Sunstorm, with bassist Dennis Ward of German rock band Pink Cream 69 under the title, Sunstorm featuring Joe Lynn Turner. Subsequent albums were released under the name, Sunstorm.

Turner was a guest performer in the Voices of Classic Rock shows.

In 2007, Turner also appeared as a headliner with AC/DC frontman Brian Johnson on the Classic Rock Cares charity tour, which was organized by longtime friend Steve Luongo, who was the drummer/producer of The John Entwistle Band.

In 2008, Turner formed Over the Rainbow, a tribute band composed of former Rainbow musicians, including drummer Bobby Rondinelli, bassist Greg Smith, keyboardist Paul Morris and Ritchie Blackmore's eldest son, Jürgen on guitar.

He was also a member of the touring band Big Noize from 2008 to 2012. The band featured Turner alongside guitarist Carlos Cavazo, bassist Phil Soussan, and drummer Vinny Appice. In the fall of 2008, the band traveled to Iraq and Kuwait to entertain Multi National Forces. Drummer, Simon Wright, replaced Appice temporarily due to other touring commitments.

In the summer of 2012, he and the Legends Voice of Rock did a gig at the Golden Times Festival in Degerfors, Sweden.

In 2013, he sang a few songs in a guest role on the Avantasia album The Mystery of Time, released in March.

March and April 2013 saw Turner perform as a special guest artist for the Las Vegas show Raiding the Rock Vault at the LVH Hotel and Casino.

in 2014 a band he was in: Rated X, released their self-titled debut through Frontiers. The band was led by Carmine Appice of Vanilla Fudge, The Firm bassist Tony Franklin, and guitarist Karl Cochran.

In February 2015, Turner was a guest singer, alongside the winner Slavin Slavchev, in the final of the third season of X Factor Bulgaria. They sang together "Street of Dreams".

Turner was extensively interviewed for the 2016 book, The Other Side of Rainbow, by author Greg Prato, and is also featured on the book's cover.

2021 saw Turner singing two songs on the Michael Schenker Group album Immortal.

In recent years, Turner has received recognition and distinguished awards from around the world. In 2015 he was named Cultural Ambassador to Bulgaria. That same year, he accepted the Legends of Rock Award in Italy, and the Peacemaker Award in Crimea for the promotion of peace and outstanding contribution to World Art. And in 2016,he received the Man of the Golden Voice Award in Peru.

In August 2022, Turner released "Belly of the Beast", the first single and title track off the new studio album. In the press release, he also went public with having been diagnosed with alopecia totalis at the age of just 3 and having to wear a wig since age 14 in order to hide his lack of hair.

Discography

Solo
 Rescue You (1985)
 Nothing's Changed (1995)
 Under Cover (1997, cover album)
 Hurry Up and Wait (1998)
 Under Cover 2 (1999, cover album)
 Holy Man (2000)
 Slam (2001)
 JLT (2003)
 The Usual Suspects (2005)
 Second Hand Life (2007)
 The Sessions (2016, compilation)
 Belly of the Beast (2022)

EPs
 Waiting for a Girl Like You (1999)
 Challenge Them All (2001)
 The One (2004)

Live albums
 Live in Germany (2008)
 Street of Dreams – Boston 1985 (2016)

As band member

Guest appearances
 Soundtrack The Heavenly Kid (1985) –  "Heartless"
 Don Johnson – Heartbeat (1986) – backing vocals
 Michael Bolton – The Hunger (1987) – backing vocals
 Cher – Cher (1987) – backing vocals
 John Waite – Rovers Return (1987) – backing vocals
 Lee Aaron – Lee Aaron (1987) – co-writer on "Powerline", "Hands Are Tied" and "Number One".
 Jimmy Barnes – Freight Train Heart (1987) – co-writer of "Walk On"
 Bonfire – Fireworks (1987) – co-writer of "Sleeping All Alone" and "Sweet Obsession"
 TNT – Intuition (1988) – backing vocals
 Bonnie Tyler – Notes from America aka Hide Your Heart (1988) – backing vocals
 Don Johnson – Let It Roll (1989) – backing vocals
 Mick Jones – Mick Jones (1989)
 Alexa – Alexa (1989)
 Paul Carrack – Groove Approved (1989)
 Billy Joel – Storm Front (1989) – backing vocals
 Slyce – Slyce (1990)
 Riot – The Privilege of Power (1990) – vocals on "Killer"
 Michael Bolton – Time, Love and Tenderness (1991) – backing vocals
 Kathy Troccoli – Pure Attraction (1991) – backing vocals
 Lita Ford – Dangerous Curves (1991) – co-writer of "Little Too Early", backing vocals
 Hellcats – Hellcats 2 (1992)
 TNT – Realized Fantasies (1992) – backing vocals
 Taylor Dayne – Soul Dancing (1993) – backing vocals
 Bloodline – Bloodline (1994)
 L.A. Blues Authority vol. 5 – Cream of the Crop (1994 compilation of covers by Blues Bureau International) – "Sittin' on Top of the World"
 Deep Purple Tribute – Smoke on the Water (1994) 
 Nerds – Poultry in Motion (1995)
 Black Night: Tribute to Deep Purple (1995) 
 Toshi Kankawa – Toshi Kankawa (1996)
 Mojo Brothers – Mojo Brothers (1997)
 Thunderbolt: A Tribute to AC/DC (1997) – "Back in Black"
 Vick LeCar – Never Stranded (1998)
 Stuart Smith – Heaven & Earth (1998)
 Niji Densetsu – Rainbow Tribute (1998)
 Randy Rhoads Tribute (1999) – "Mr Crowley", "Over the Mountain", "Diary of a Madman"
 Leslie West – As Phat as It Gets (1999)
 Fire Woman: A Tribute to The Cult (2000) – "The Rain"
 Bat Head Soup: A Tribute to Ozzy (2000) – "Hellraiser"
 Tribute to Van Halen (2000) – "Dance the Night Away"
 Nikolo Kotzev – Nikolo Kotzev's Nostradamus (2001)
 Voices for America – Special WTC EP (2001)
 Aerosmith Tribute – Let the Tribute Do the Talking (2001) – "Let the Music Do the Talking"
 Rock Ballads – WTC Benefit (2001)
 Stone Cold Queen: A Tribute (2001) – "Fat Bottomed Girls"
 Terry Brock – Freedom (2001)
 The Tour Bus Radio Show – The Road Trip (2002)
 Mountain – Mystic Fire (2002)
 Mr. Big Tribute – Influences and Connections (2003) – "Colorado Bulldog", "Daddy Brother Lover Little Boy"
 Murray Weinstock – Tails of the City (2003)
 Metallic Attack: The Ultimate Tribute (2004) – "Nothing Else Matters"
 Karl Cochran's Voodooland – Give Me Air (2004)
 Eddie Ojeda – Axes 2 Axes (2005)
 Numbers from the Beast (2005) – "2 Minutes to Midnight"
 Vitalij Kuprij – Revenge (2005) – "Follow Your Heart"
 Michael Schenker Group – Heavy Hitters (2005) – "All Shook Up"
 Blackmore's Night – The Village Lanterne (2006) – bonus track version of "Street of Dreams"
 Icarus Witch – Songs for the Lost (2007)
 Jimi Jamison – Crossroads Moment  (2008)
 We Wish You a Metal Xmas and a Headbanging New Year (2008) – "Rockin' Around the Xmas Tree"
 Howard Leese – Secret Weapon (2009) – "Alive Again", "Hot to Cold"
 The Ultimate Tribute to Ozzy Osbourne (2009) – "Hellraiser"
 MelodicRock.com, Vol. 7 – Forces of Dark & Light (2010) – "This Is Who I Am" – premiere song
 Pushking – The World as We Love It (2011) – "Kukarracha", "Head Shooter"
 Robin Beck – The Great Escape (2011) – "That All Depends"
 Who Are You: An All Star Tribute to The Who (2012) – "The Seeker"
 George Gakis & Very Special Friends – Too Much Ain't Never Enough (2012) – "Street of Broken Dreams"
 Avantasia – The Mystery of Time (2013) – "Spectres", "The Watchmakers' Dream", "Savior in the Clockwork", "The Great Mystery"
 Fly Like an Eagle: An All-Star Tribute to Steve Miller Band (2013) – "Jungle Love"
 Light My Fire: A Classic Rock Salute to the Doors (2014) – "Riders on the Storm"
 Magnus Karlsson's Free Fall – Kingdom of Rock (2015) – "No Control"
 Paco Ventura – Black Moon (2015)
 The Parliament of Souls – project honouring the memory of Václav Havel (2016)
 Star One – Revel in Time (2022) – "The Year of '41"

References

External links

 Official Joe Lynn Turner website
 

1951 births
Living people
American heavy metal singers
American rock singers
American male singers
American tenors
People from Hackensack, New Jersey
American people of Italian descent
Songwriters from New Jersey
Singers from New Jersey
Rainbow (rock band) members
Deep Purple members
Mother's Army members
Yngwie J. Malmsteen's Rising Force members
Frontiers Records artists
Elektra Records artists
Cleopatra Records artists
Brazen Abbot members